James Vickers 'Vic' Donald (17 February 1925 – 8 August 2002) was an Australian rules footballer who played with Collingwood in the Victorian Football League (VFL).

Notes

External links 

1925 births
Australian rules footballers from Victoria (Australia)
Collingwood Football Club players
2002 deaths
People from Yarra Ranges